Marlon David Jackson (born March 12, 1957) is an American entertainer, singer, and dancer best known as a member of the Jackson 5. He is the sixth child of the Jackson family. Marlon now runs Study Peace Foundation to promote peace and unity worldwide.

Early life

Marlon David Jackson was born on March 12, 1957, at St Mary's Mercy Hospital in Gary, Indiana, the sixth child of Joseph who was a steel mill worker, and played in an R&B band, the Falcons, with his brother Luther, and Katherine Jackson, a Jehovah's Witness. He was born seventeen and a half months before his younger brother Michael (born August 29, 1958). Growing up, Marlon was especially close to Michael, whom he considered the substitute for his lost twin brother, Brandon, who died shortly after birth. Marlon and Michael were a fun team. “We were the jokers of the family,"  Marlon said. They would often get in trouble, but they stuck together.   

By 1964, Marlon and Michael joined their brothers Tito, Jackie and Jermaine, forming the group the Jackson 5. Mother, Katherine played the piano and clarinet, and sang harmonies with the brothers. Father, Joe led the rehearsals, keeping them off the street and away from trouble. They won singing competitions all over the state including New York. That marked the beginning of their career. Because of their name the Jackson 5, Randy Jackson the youngest Jackson brother didn't make the cut. He was later included in the TV program “The Jacksons” in 1976 as well as some performances. Marlon was known as “the dancingest Jackson”, cause of his flamboyant dance moves, a name he himself came up with. Marlon was not the most prominent member of the Jackson 5. He did sing lead vocals on many of their hits. Marlon also played the conga and tambourine. Marlon has three sisters; Rebbie, La Toya and Janet.

Career

The Jackson 5 

Marlon and his brothers first signed as  the Jackson 5 with Gordon Keith of Steeltown Records in November 1967, and their first single "Big Boy", was released on January 31, 1968. After the group recorded three more songs with the Steeltown label (on two records) they were signed with Berry Gordy of Motown Records in 1969. Not feeling that they were being paid fair royalties by Motown Records for their success as well as their desire for creative control, the Jackson 5 decided to leave the label and sign with Epic Records in 1975. Jermaine split from the Jackson Five to start a solo career at Motown, and was replaced by his brother Randy Jackson. Unbeknownst to the group, Gordy had trademarked the name The Jackson Five and did not allow the group to continue using the name when they left the label. Once signed with Epic, the group became known simply as The Jacksons. In 1983, Gordy asked the group to perform at the Motown 25: Yesterday, Today, Forever television special. In 1997, he was inducted into the Rock and Roll Hall of Fame in 1997 with his brothers. In 2001, he reunited with his brothers to perform for the Michael Jackson 30th Anniversary Special.

Solo career 
Like Michael and Jermaine, Marlon began a solo career, releasing the album Baby Tonight in 1987. Despite Baby Tonight reaching No. 22 on the Top R&B Albums chart in the United States, Marlon has not released another album since then.

Later work
Marlon was successful within real estate in Southern California. In 1999, Marlon started running the Major Broadcasting Corporation (MBC) along with Florida attorney Willie E. Gary, baseball player Cecil Fielder, boxer Evander Holyfield, and Alvin James. MBC was a religious network based in Atlanta. In October 1, 2004, they rebranded as Black Family Channel. In May 2007, the Black Family Channel was sold to the Gospel Music Channel, now known as Up TV. In 2008, Marlon and a board of new partners founded the Motherland Group, LLC bringing recognition to Badagry, Nigeria.

Marlon now runs the Study Peace Foundation, founded in 2015, aimed to promote peace and unity in communities worldwide offering programs designed to engage children, adults and the elderly to live in peaceful environments. “As a community we all should know that promoting peace and unity would cause a chain reaction that children will observe. It all starts with what we make accessible to the children,” he said. The foundation went into a partnership with KaBOOM! (non-profit organization) to build playgrounds in New Orleans, Gary and Los Angeles.

Personal life

Family
In August 1975, 18-year-old Jackson married his girlfriend, Carol Ann Parker, whom he met in New Orleans during one of the Jacksons' tours. Marlon and Parker have three children:

 Valencia Caroline Jackson (born December 18, 1976)
 Brittany Shauntee Jackson (born September 4, 1978) 
 Marlon David Jackson Jr. (born September 23, 1981)

Marlon and Carol have six grandchildren, two from Valencia and four from Brittany.

Michael's memorial
On July 7, 2009, at the Staples Center, Marlon and his family offered their final eulogies for Michael, saying he was the "soul" of the family, addressing the crowd: "Maybe now, Michael, they will leave you alone" and "I would like for you to give our brother, my twin brother, Brandon, a hug for me." Marlon said, "I love you, Michael, and I'll miss you.". In honor of Michael, Marlon and his brothers, Tito, Jackie, Jermaine and Randy Jackson served as pallbearers wearing a gold necktie, a single white glove and sunglasses.

In a 2019 Rolling Stone interview, Marlon was vocal about the allegations against his brother Michael saying, “if your brother was deceased and someone wanted to slander his name, you’d be supporting him. That’s not him. That’s not his character. We definitely know our brother, and there are no facts whatsoever to corroborate these allegations." He continues, "It’s a quick money grab. That’s all it is."

Discography

Studio albums

Singles

Other contributions

1980: La Toya Jackson – La Toya Jackson
1981: My Special Love – La Toya Jackson
1983: Wright Back at You – Betty Wright
1983: Respect – Billy Griffin 
1984: Heart Don't Lie – La Toya Jackson
1984: Dream Street – Janet Jackson 
1985: "We Are the World" – USA for Africa
1986: The Golden Child Soundtrack. 
1989: 2300 Jackson Street – The Jacksons featuring Michael Jackson, Janet Jackson, Rebbie Jackson and Marlon Jackson.
2011: AI Feat. The Jacksons (Jackie Jackson/Tito Jackson/Marlon Jackson) - Letter in the Sky 
2021: Tito Jackson Feat. Marlon Jackson/Stevie Wonder/Kenny Neal and Bobby Rush - Love One Another

References

1957 births
Living people
20th-century American singers
21st-century American singers
African-American male dancers
African-American male singers
African-American record producers
African-American songwriters
American funk singers
American male dancers
American male pop singers
American male singers
American multi-instrumentalists
American people who self-identify as being of Native American descent
American rhythm and blues musicians
American rhythm and blues singers
American soul singers
American twins
Child pop musicians
Identical twins
Marlon Jackson
Musicians from Gary, Indiana
Record producers from Indiana
Singers from Indiana
Songwriters from Indiana
The Jackson 5 members